All Saints' Church, King's Heath, is a Grade II listed Church of England parish in the Anglican Diocese of Birmingham.

History
The church was constructed by Edward Holmes and Frederick Preedy in 1860. It was consecrated on 26 July 1860 by Henry Pepys the Bishop of Worcester. The spire was completed in 1866.

The north aisle, organ chamber and vestries were added in 1883 by J. A. Chatwin. The west end was enlarged in 1899 by J. P. Sharp.

Organ
An organ was presented to the church around 1864 by Mr. Dawes. This was replaced in 1892 by an organ by Flight and Robson from St. John's Church, Blackheath, London.

In 1926 and organ by Nicholson and Co was installed. A specification of the organ can be found on the National Pipe Organ Register. This was replaced in 2008 by a Phoenix Digital Organ.

Notable clergy
 David Monteith, now Dean of Leicester, served his curacy here from 1993 to 1997.
 Michael Parker, later Bishop of Bradford, was vicar from 1939 to 1957

References

Grade II listed buildings in Birmingham
Church of England church buildings in Birmingham, West Midlands
Churches completed in 1860
19th-century Church of England church buildings
Gothic Revival church buildings in England
Gothic Revival architecture in the West Midlands (county)
Grade II listed churches in the West Midlands (county)